The H.G. Wood Professor of the Philosophy of Religion (formerly known as H.G. Wood Professor of Theology) is a chair at the University of Birmingham associated with the School of Philosophy, Theology and Religion. The chair was established in 1961 and named after a Quaker theologian H. G. Wood at Birmingham. The first post-holder was Ninian Smart, who was succeeded by John Hick. Along with Nolloth Professor of the Philosophy of the Christian Religion at Oxford and Norris–Hulse Professor of Divinity at Cambridge it is one of three main endowed chairs in the UK focusing on philosophy of religion.

List of H. G. Wood Professors

References 

University of Birmingham
Professorships in theology
1961 establishments in England